In mathematics, a sesquilinear form is a generalization of a bilinear form that, in turn, is a generalization of the concept of the dot product of Euclidean space. A bilinear form is linear in each of its arguments, but a sesquilinear form allows one of the arguments to be "twisted" in a semilinear manner, thus the name; which originates from the Latin numerical prefix sesqui- meaning "one and a half". The basic concept of the dot product – producing a scalar from a pair of vectors – can be generalized by allowing a broader range of scalar values and, perhaps simultaneously, by widening the definition of a vector.

A motivating special case is a sesquilinear form on a complex vector space, . This is a map  that is linear in one argument and "twists" the linearity of the other argument by complex conjugation (referred to as being antilinear in the other argument). This case arises naturally in mathematical physics applications. Another important case allows the scalars to come from any field and the twist is provided by a field automorphism.

An application in projective geometry requires that the scalars come from a division ring (skew field), and this means that the "vectors" should be replaced by elements of a -module. In a very general setting, sesquilinear forms can be defined over -modules for arbitrary rings .

Informal introduction
Sesquilinear forms abstract and generalize the basic notion of a Hermitian form on complex vector space. Hermitian forms are commonly seen in physics, as the inner product on a complex Hilbert space.

By inserting an extra factor of  into the product, one obtains the skew-Hermitian form, defined more precisely, below. There is no particular reason to restrict the definition to the complex numbers; it can be defined for arbitrary rings carrying an antiautomorphism, informally understood to be a generalized concept of "complex conjugation" for the ring.

Convention
Conventions differ as to which argument should be linear. In the commutative case, we shall take the first to be linear, as is common in the mathematical literature, except in the section devoted to sesquilinear forms on complex vector spaces. There we use the other convention and take the first argument to be conjugate-linear (i.e. antilinear) and the second to be linear. This is the convention used mostly by physicists and originates in Dirac's bra–ket notation in quantum mechanics.

In the more general noncommutative setting, with right modules we take the second argument to be linear and with left modules we take the first argument to be linear.

Complex vector spaces 

Assumption: In this section, sesquilinear forms are antilinear in their first argument and linear in their second.

Over a complex vector space  a map  is sesquilinear if

for all  and all  Here,  is the complex conjugate of a scalar 

A complex sesquilinear form can also be viewed as a complex bilinear map

where  is the complex conjugate vector space to  By the universal property of tensor products these are in one-to-one correspondence with complex linear maps

Likewise, the map  is a conjugate-linear functional on 

Given any complex sesquilinear form  on  we can define a second complex sesquilinear form  via the conjugate transpose:

In general,  and  will be different. If they are the same then  is said to be . If they are negatives of one another, then  is said to be . Every sesquilinear form can be written as a sum of a Hermitian form and a skew-Hermitian form.

Matrix representation 

If  is a finite-dimensional complex vector space, then relative to any basis  of  a sesquilinear form is represented by a matrix  and given by

where  is the conjugate transpose. The components of the matrix  are given by

Hermitian form 
The term Hermitian form may also refer to a different concept than that explained below: it may refer to a certain differential form on a Hermitian manifold.

A complex Hermitian form (also called a symmetric sesquilinear form), is a sesquilinear form  such that

More generally, the inner product on any complex Hilbert space is a Hermitian form.

A minus sign is introduced in the Hermitian form  to define the group SU(1,1).

A vector space with a Hermitian form  is called a Hermitian space.

The matrix representation of a complex Hermitian form is a Hermitian matrix.

A complex Hermitian form applied to a single vector

is always a real number. One can show that a complex sesquilinear form is Hermitian if and only if the associated quadratic form is real for all

Skew-Hermitian form 

A complex skew-Hermitian form (also called an antisymmetric sesquilinear form), is a complex sesquilinear form  such that

Every complex skew-Hermitian form can be written as the imaginary unit  times a Hermitian form.

The matrix representation of a complex skew-Hermitian form is a skew-Hermitian matrix.

A complex skew-Hermitian form applied to a single vector

is always a purely imaginary number.

Over a division ring
This section applies unchanged when the division ring  is commutative.  More specific terminology then also applies: the division ring is a field, the anti-automorphism is also an automorphism, and the right module is a vector space.  The following applies to a left module with suitable reordering of expressions.

Definition

Orthogonality

Reflexivity
 implies 
That is, a sesquilinear form is reflexive precisely when the derived orthogonality relation is symmetric.

Hermitian variations

If , the form is called -Hermitian, and if , it is called -anti-Hermitian.  (When  is implied, respectively simply Hermitian or anti-Hermitian.)

It also follows that  is a fixed point of the map .

Example
Let  be the three dimensional vector space over the finite field , where  is a prime power.

The map  is then a -sesquilinear form. The matrix  associated to this form is the identity matrix. This is a Hermitian form.

In projective geometry

Assumption: In this section, sesquilinear forms are antilinear (resp. linear) in their second (resp. first) argument.

In a projective geometry , a permutation  of the subspaces that inverts inclusion, i.e.
is called a correlation. A result of Birkhoff and von Neumann (1936) shows that the correlations of desarguesian projective geometries correspond to the nondegenerate sesquilinear forms on the underlying vector space.

To achieve full generality of this statement, and since every desarguesian projective geometry may be coordinatized by a division ring, Reinhold Baer extended the definition of a sesquilinear form to a division ring, which requires replacing vector spaces by -modules. (In the geometric literature these are still referred to as either left or right vector spaces over skewfields.)

Over arbitrary rings
The specialization of the above section to skewfields was a consequence of the application to projective geometry, and not intrinsic to the nature of sesquilinear forms. Only the minor modifications needed to take into account the non-commutativity of multiplication are required to generalize the arbitrary field version of the definition to arbitrary rings.

A map  is -sesquilinear if

An element  is orthogonal to another element  with respect to the sesquilinear form  (written ) if .  This relation need not be symmetric, i.e.  does not imply .

A sesquilinear form  is Hermitian if there exists  such that

A Hermitian form is necessarily reflexive, and if it is nonzero, the associated antiautomorphism  is an involution (i.e. of order 2).

It follows from this that a right (left) -module  can be turned into a left (right) -module, . Thus, the sesquilinear form  can be viewed as a bilinear form .

See also
 *-ring

Notes

References

External links

 

Functional analysis
Linear algebra